Quj Maz (also Romanized as Qūj Maz; also known as Qūjeh Maz) is a village in Aq Su Rural District, in the Central District of Kalaleh County, Golestan Province, Iran. At the 2006 census, its population was 1,807, in 355 families.

References 

Populated places in Kalaleh County